Osphya is a genus of false darkling beetles in the family Melandryidae. There are about seven described species in Osphya.

Species
These seven species belong to the genus Osphya:
 Osphya aeneipennis Kriechbaumer, 1848 g
 Osphya bipunctata (Fabricius, 1775) g
 Osphya formosana Pic, 1910 g
 Osphya lutea b
 Osphya trilineata Pic, 1910 g
 Osphya vandalitiae (Kraatz, 1868) g
 Osphya varians (LeConte, 1866) g b
Data sources: i = ITIS, c = Catalogue of Life, g = GBIF, b = Bugguide.net

References

Further reading

External links

 

Melandryidae